"Everybody Dies" (stylized in all lowercase) is a single by American rapper J. Cole, released on December 5, 2016 along with his single "False Prophets". The two songs were previously previewed on the documentary Eyez.

Background 
"Everybody Dies" was originally included on J. Cole's fourth studio album 4 Your Eyez Only. It was later omitted due to the song not fitting the album's concept. In 2018, Cole revealed that the song was supposed to be on the tracklist of his upcoming sixth studio album The Fall Off.

The song samples "Me Against the World" by 2Pac featuring Dramacydal, "Inside My Love" by Minnie Riperton, and "Theme From the Planets" by Dexter Wansel.

Controversy 
J. Cole took aim at rappers using "Lil" in their stage names on the track, specifically with the following lines: "Especially the amateur eight-week rappers, Lil' whatever / Just another short bus rapper." Most assumed that this was directed at Lil Yachty and Lil Uzi Vert.

Responses 
During an interview with Los Angeles' radio station Power 106, Lil Yachty responded by saying: "I don't listen to J. Cole [but] I definitely listened to it [and] people said he was talking about me. He said 'Lil.' I'm not little. My name has 'Lil' in it but there's a lot of 'Lil' rappers. [It's] either me or Uzi. Honestly, I don't give a fuck." He also said that Cole's dissing may have been triggered by Yachty's early messages on Twitter trolling J. Cole, most notably "Fuck J. Cole".

Lil Uzi Vert acknowledged the track on Twitter, responding: "Heard some beautiful shit today @JColeNC 🔥💯. 😈®️".

Charts

Certifications

References 

2016 singles
2016 songs
J. Cole songs
Song recordings produced by J. Cole
Songs written by J. Cole
Roc Nation singles